Asur  is a village in Tiruchirappalli taluk of Tiruchirappalli district, Tamil Nadu.

Demographics 

As per the 2001 census, Asur had a population of 1,850 with 933 males and 917 females. The sex ratio was 983 and the literacy rate, 70.77.

References 

 

Villages in Tiruchirappalli district